Schenefeld may refer to two municipalities in Schleswig-Holstein, Germany:

Schenefeld, Pinneberg
Schenefeld, Steinburg